Manuela Josefa Cabrera Taveras (born September 18, 1943), known as Fefita La Grande, is a Dominican accordionist and the most recognized female performer of typical merengue, a more rural variation of merengue, the main musical genre of the Dominican Republic. She is one of the greatest representatives of the "typical genre" along with artists such as Tatico Henríquez, Pedro Reynoso, El Ciego de Nagua, Francisco Peralta, Rafaelito Román, Francisco Ulloa, among others. Her version of the song "La chiflera" is an emblem of typical music. Biography 
She was born in a small town in the province of Santiago Rodríguez in the Dominican Republic. Daughter of Eliseo Cabrera (Seíto) and María Anna Taveras, from a very young age she began to be interested in music by playing the accordion inside her father's workshop. She was motivated to play the accordion after listening to the songs of Guandulito, one of the pioneers of typical merengue.

At the age of seven she was already known in her community for her talent as an accordionist and at nine she already entertained parties with accordion, güira and tambora. In the mid-1950s, due to her talent and charisma, she was approached by José "Petán" Arismendy (brother of dictator Rafael Leónidas Trujillo) who, upon hearing her play, took a hundred pesos out of his pocket and gave them to Fefita, who was barely twelve years old.

The name "La Vieja Fefa" was given to her by Tatico Henríquez when she was 17 years old and Bartolo Alvarado "El Ciego de Nagua" baptized her with the name "Fefita La Grande" when she was about 22 years old. Since 1980, he has been called "La Mayimba", the name she likes the most.

Years later he traveled abroad accompanying the teacher Rafael Solano on one of his tours of Puerto Rico and later to other countries. She was the first Dominican artist to bring typical merengue to Europe. At the same time she began  career with her first LP "Si quiere venir que venga", although already by that time Fefita had a wide musical repertoire and enjoyed great acceptance by the public. she has performed merengues by many authors, including his father Don Seito, as well as compositions whose melody and lyrics are her own.

All her life she maintained a unique style when playing the accordion, his merengues are similar to those of Tatico Henríquez or El Trío Reynoso, which maintain the essence of the original typical merengue and enramada music. She has criticized in interviews the contemporary merengueros who, according to her, have deformed the merengue "accelerating it and killing it by touching it in a strange way."

She is a survivor of breast cancer.

Innovations and style
Cabrera had a unique style of playing merengue tipico, a kind that only she was able to produce. Along with the early exponents of "new" merengue tipico, such as Tatico Henriquez, Samuelito Almonte, and El Ciego de Nagua, she added congas, saxophones, and electric bass to the tipico ensemble, which was originally composed of three musicians: an accordionist (using a diatonic 2-row accordion), a tambora player ("tamborero"), and güira player ("guirero"). La Mayimba was also the first to bring merengue tipico to European audiences.

Collaborations
La Mayimba's success is also partially achieved because of her ability to stay with the times and constantly reinvent her sound with the help of new tipico artists. Performing with the likes of Krisspy and El Prodigio, she continues to appeal to the young and also Película Perico Ripiao. In 2019, she teamed up with other Dominican merengue singers Milly Quezada and Maridalia Hernández for "La Pimienta Es La Que Pica".

DiscographyLa Ciudad Corazón (2001)Date Brillo Cadenita (1999)Soy Original (1997)Yo Sigo Pa' Lante (1995)Todos los Hombres Son Buenos (1993)Cantando He de Morir (1991)Vámonos Pa'l Can (1990)La Cintura Mía (1989)Fefita la Grande (1981)La Pimienta Es la Que Pica (1980)Merengues Típicos (1980)Merengues Típicos Vol. 1'' (1979)

See also
 Merengue tipico

Sources
 iASO Records - Fefita La Grande Bio
 Short biography of Fefita
 Biography from www.afropop.org

Specific

1943 births
Living people
People from Santiago Rodríguez Province
Dominican Republic musicians
Merengue musicians
21st-century accordionists
Women in Latin music